Sidelines of the City is the third album by Canadian indie rock band Cuff the Duke, released on October 23, 2007.

Track listing
"If I Live or If I Die" – 3:42
"Surging Revival" – 4:04
"Failure to Some" – 7:01
"Remember the Good Times" – 2:47
"The Ballad of the Tired Old Man" – 4:06
"Long Road" – 3:51
"When All Else Fails & Fades" – 2:15
"By Winter's End" – 4:12
"Rossland Square" – 3:00
"Confessions from a Parkdale Basement" – 3:46

Personnel
Paul Lowman – bass, piano, fiddle, vocals 
Dale Murray – guitar, pedal steel, vocals, engineer
Wayne Petti – vocals, guitar, Moog, bass (track 2) 
Corey Wood – drums, percussion  
Paul Aucoin – producer, engineer, organ (4, 5, 6, 8), glockenspiel (3)
Shaun Brodie – trumpet (5)
Nathan Lawr – drums (1, 6, 10)
Andrew McCormack – drums (4, 8, 9)
Alana Stuart – vocals (1)
Jason Tait – drums (2, 5), percussion, (1), saw (2)
Lorne Houndsel – mixing 
Francois Turenne – engineer 
Noah Mintz – mastering

2007 albums
Cuff the Duke albums